Memoirs of a Sinner is a 1986 Polish film directed by Wojciech Jerzy Has, starring Piotr Bajor. The film is an adaptation of The Private Memoirs and Confessions of a Justified Sinner (1824) and tells the tale of the protagonist Robert and his doppelganger.

Premise
Robert (Piotr Bajor) is exhumed from the grave by a gang of grave robbers and is forced to recount his lifestory - a struggle between good and evil, embodied in his doppelganger whom he eventually kills.

Cast
 Piotr Bajor as Robert
 Maciej Kozłowski as Stranger
 Janusz Michalowski as Pastor
 Hanna Stankówna as Rabina
 Ewa Wiśniewska as Laura
 Franciszek Pieczka as Logan
 Anna Dymna as Dominika
 Katarzyna Figura as Cyntia
 Jan Jankowski as Gustaw
 Jan Pawel Kruk as Guard
 Andrzej Krukowski
 Zdzislaw Kuzniar 		
 Zofia Merle	
 Jerzy Zygmunt Nowak as Samuel
 Elwira Romanczuk as Malgorzata

Production
The film was filmed in the village of Klęk in the Polish province of Łódź.

Release
The film was released on 20 October 1986. Jerzy Maksymiuk's score won the award for Best Score at the 1986 Polish Film Festival.

The critical perspective
Has maintains the strangeness central to the novel, although he tends to focus on the creation of unease, intrigue and beautiful images rather than Hogg's satire on Calvinist predestination.

See also
 Cinema of Poland
 List of Polish language films

References

External links
 

1986 films
Polish drama films
1980s Polish-language films
Films directed by Wojciech Has
Films based on British novels
1986 drama films